Peter Boyle (1935–2006) was an American actor.

Peter Boyle  may also refer to:

Sport
 Peter Boyle (footballer, born 1876) (1876–1939), Irish footballer
 Peter Boyle (footballer, born 1951), Scottish footballer
 Peter Boyle (Gaelic footballer), Gaelic football goalkeeper for Donegal

Others
 Peter Boyle (epidemiologist) (born 1951), Scottish epidemiologist
 Peter Boyle (film editor) (born 1946), English film editor
 Peter Boyle (poet) (born 1951), Australian poet